Golbey Épinal Thaon Vosges, commonly known as GET Vosges, is a French basketball club based in Épinal. The club currently plays in the Nationale Masculine 1, the third tier of basketball in France.

Notable players

 Eric Kibi

References

Basketball teams in France
Basketball teams established in 1978